This is a record of Saudi Arabia's results at the FIFA World Cup. The FIFA World Cup, sometimes called the Football World Cup or the Soccer World Cup, but usually referred to simply as the World Cup, is an international association football competition contested by the men's national teams of the members of Fédération Internationale de Football Association (FIFA), the sport's global governing body. The championship has been awarded every four years since the first tournament in 1930, except in 1942 and 1946, due to World War II.

The tournament consists of two parts, the qualification phase and the final phase (officially called the World Cup Finals). The qualification phase, which currently take place over the three years preceding the Finals, is used to determine which teams qualify for the Finals. The current format of the Finals involves 32 teams competing for the title, at venues within the host nation (or nations) over a period of about a month. The World Cup Finals is the most widely viewed sporting event in the world, with an estimated 715.1 million people watching the 2006 tournament final.

Saudi Arabia has qualified for a total of six FIFA World Cup tournaments, having played in 1994, 1998, 2002, 2006, 2018 and 2022. Their best performance was in 1994, where they reached the round of 16.

.

FIFA World Cup record

List of matches

Record players

Top goalscorers

Sami Al-Jaber is not only the most successful Saudi striker at the FIFA World Cup to date, he also managed to score in World Cups twelve years apart (1994 and 2006). He shares this record with eight other players, among them Pelé, Diego Maradona, Miroslav Klose, Lionel Messi and Cristiano Ronaldo.

Squads

References

External links
Saudi Arabia at FIFA

 
Countries at the FIFA World Cup